Iggy Pintado (born Ignacio José Ramon de la Santísima Trinidad Pintado y Vicente on 8 August 1961) is a Spanish-Australian author and marketer who wrote the book Connection Generation.

From 1986 to 2008, he held professional, management and executive positions in marketing, sales and online management at IBM Australia (1986–2006), Telstra (2006–2008), UXC Connect (2010-2012),  Australian Institute of Company Directors (2013-2015) and [SAS A/NZ]. He is currently Managing Director at IDC Australia and New Zealand.

In 2004, Pintado was awarded the inaugural Certified Practising Marketer (CPM) of the Year by the Australian Marketing Institute (AMI).

In mid-2008, he co-founded a business networking consulting, marketing, speaking and mentoring business called ConnectGen. This business is now known as Iggy Pintado.

In  2009, he released the book, Connection Generation, a study of connectedness and how it affects society and business.

He is based in Sydney, Australia.

Bibliography
 Connection Generation (2008)

References

External links
Personal website

Business speakers
Living people
Australian social sciences writers
Macquarie University alumni
Writers from Sydney
Australian businesspeople
1961 births